Airport Parkway may refer to:

Railway stations
 Luton Airport Parkway railway station
 Southampton Airport Parkway railway station

Roads

Canada
 Airport Parkway (Ottawa), in Ottawa, Ontario, Canada

United States
 Airport Parkway (Mississippi)
 Bryan Boulevard in Greensboro, North Carolina, formerly known as Airport Parkway
 Airport Parkway near Pittsburgh comprises two routes:
Interstate 376 Business between University Boulevard and its eastern terminus
Interstate 376 between exit 57 and exit 60

See also
 Airport Expressway